Argyrotaenia brimuncus is a species of moth of the family Tortricidae. It is found in Costa Rica.

References

B
Endemic fauna of Costa Rica
Moths of Central America
Moths described in 2000